Nondimensionalization is the partial or full removal of physical dimensions from an equation involving physical quantities by a suitable substitution of variables. This technique can simplify and parameterize problems where measured units are involved. It is closely related to dimensional analysis. In some physical systems, the term scaling is used interchangeably with nondimensionalization, in order to suggest that certain quantities are better measured relative to some appropriate unit. These units refer to quantities intrinsic to the system, rather than units such as SI units. Nondimensionalization is not the same as converting extensive quantities in an equation to intensive quantities, since the latter procedure results in variables that still carry units.

Nondimensionalization can also recover characteristic properties of a system. For example, if a system has an intrinsic resonance frequency, length, or time constant, nondimensionalization can recover these values. The technique is especially useful for systems that can be described by differential equations. One important use is in the analysis of control systems.
One of the simplest characteristic units is the doubling time of a system experiencing exponential growth, or conversely the half-life of a system experiencing exponential decay; a more natural pair of characteristic units is mean age/mean lifetime, which correspond to base e rather than base 2.

Many illustrative examples of nondimensionalization originate from simplifying differential equations. This is because a large body of physical problems can be formulated in terms of differential equations. Consider the following:

 List of dynamical systems and differential equations topics
 List of partial differential equation topics
 Differential equations of mathematical physics

Although nondimensionalization is well adapted for these problems, it is not restricted to them. An example of a non-differential-equation application is dimensional analysis; another example is normalization in statistics.

Measuring devices are practical examples of nondimensionalization occurring in everyday life. Measuring devices are calibrated relative to some known unit. Subsequent measurements are made relative to this standard. Then, the absolute value of the measurement is recovered by scaling with respect to the standard.

Rationale 
Suppose a pendulum is swinging with a particular period T. For such a system, it is advantageous to perform calculations relating to the swinging relative to T. In some sense, this is normalizing the measurement with respect to the period.

Measurements made relative to an intrinsic property of a system will apply to other systems which also have the same intrinsic property. It also allows one to compare a common property of different implementations of the same system. Nondimensionalization determines in a systematic manner the characteristic units of a system to use, without relying heavily on prior knowledge of the system's intrinsic properties
(one should not confuse characteristic units of a system with natural units of nature). In fact, nondimensionalization can suggest the parameters which should be used for analyzing a system. However, it is necessary to start with an equation that describes the system appropriately.

Nondimensionalization steps 
To nondimensionalize a system of equations, one must do the following:
Identify all the independent and dependent variables;
Replace each of them with a quantity scaled relative to a characteristic unit of measure to be determined;
Divide through by the coefficient of the highest order polynomial or derivative term;
Choose judiciously the definition of the characteristic unit for each variable so that the coefficients of as many terms as possible become 1;
Rewrite the system of equations in terms of their new dimensionless quantities.

The last three steps are usually specific to the problem where nondimensionalization is applied. However, almost all systems require the first two steps to be performed.

Conventions 

There are no restrictions on the variable names used to replace "x" and "t". However, they are generally chosen so that it is convenient and intuitive to use for the problem at hand. For example, if "x" represented mass, the letter "m" might be an appropriate symbol to represent the dimensionless mass quantity.

In this article, the following conventions have been used:
 t – represents the independent variable – usually a time quantity.
 x – represents the dependent variable – can be mass, voltage, or any measurable quantity.

A subscripted c added to a quantity's variable name is used to denote the characteristic unit used to scale that quantity. For example, if x is a quantity, then xc is the characteristic unit used to scale it.

As an illustrative example, consider a first order differential equation with constant coefficients:

 In this equation the independent variable here is t, and the dependent variable is x.
 Set . This results in the equation 
 The coefficient of the highest ordered term is in front of the first derivative term. Dividing by this gives 
 The coefficient in front of  only contains one characteristic variable tc, hence it is easiest to choose to set this to unity first:  Subsequently, 
 The final dimensionless equation in this case becomes completely independent of any parameters with units:

Substitutions 
Suppose for simplicity that a certain system is characterized by two variables - a dependent variable x and an independent variable t, where x is a function of t. Both x and t represent quantities with units. To scale these two variables, assume there are two intrinsic units of measurement xc and tc with the same units as x and t respectively, such that these conditions hold:

These equations are used to replace x and t when nondimensionalizing. If differential operators are needed to describe the original system, their scaled counterparts become dimensionless differential operators.

Differential operators 
Consider the relationship

The dimensionless differential operators with respect to the independent variable becomes

Forcing function 
If a system has a forcing function  then

Hence, the new forcing function  is made to be dependent on the dimensionless quantity .

Linear differential equations with constant coefficients

First order system 
Consider the differential equation for a first order system:

The derivation of the characteristic units for this system gives

Second order system 
A second order system has the form

Substitution step 
Replace the variables x and t with their scaled quantities. The equation becomes

This new equation is not dimensionless, although all the variables with units are isolated in the coefficients. Dividing by the coefficient of the highest ordered term, the equation becomes

Now it is necessary to determine the quantities of xc and tc so that the coefficients become normalized. Since there are two free parameters, at most only two coefficients can be made to equal unity.

Determination of characteristic units 
Consider the variable tc:
If  the first order term is normalized.
If  the zeroth order term is normalized.

Both substitutions are valid. However, for pedagogical reasons, the latter substitution is used for second order systems. Choosing this substitution allows xc to be determined by normalizing the coefficient of the forcing function:

The differential equation becomes

The coefficient of the first order term is unitless. Define

The factor 2 is present so that the solutions can be parameterized in terms of ζ. In the context of mechanical or electrical systems, ζ is known as the damping ratio, and is an important parameter required in the analysis of control systems. 2ζ is also known as the linewidth of the system. The result of the definition is the universal oscillator equation.

Higher order systems 
The general n-th order linear differential equation with constant coefficients has the form:

The function f(t) is known as the forcing function.

If the differential equation only contains real (not complex) coefficients, then the properties of such a system behaves as a mixture of first and second order systems only. This is because the roots of its characteristic polynomial are either real, or complex conjugate pairs. Therefore, understanding how nondimensionalization applies to first and second ordered systems allows the properties of higher order systems to be determined through superposition.

The number of free parameters in a nondimensionalized form of a system increases with its order. For this reason, nondimensionalization is rarely used for higher order differential equations. The need for this procedure has also been reduced with the advent of symbolic computation.

Examples of recovering characteristic units 
A variety of systems can be approximated as either first or second order systems. These include mechanical, electrical, fluidic, caloric, and torsional systems. This is because the fundamental physical quantities involved within each of these examples are related through first and second order derivatives.

Mechanical oscillations 

Suppose we have a mass attached to a spring and a damper, which in turn are attached to a wall, and a force acting on the mass along the same line.
Define
  = displacement from equilibrium [m]
  = time [s]
  = external force or "disturbance" applied to system [kg⋅m⋅s−2]
  = mass of the block [kg]
  = damping constant of dashpot [kg⋅s−1]
  = force constant of spring [kg⋅s−2]

Suppose the applied force is a sinusoid , the differential equation that describes the motion of the block is

Nondimensionalizing this equation the same way as described under second order system yields several characteristics of the system.

The intrinsic unit xc corresponds to the distance the block moves per unit force

The characteristic variable tc is equal to the period of the oscillations

and the dimensionless variable 2ζ corresponds to the linewidth of the system. ζ itself is the damping ratio.

Electrical oscillations

First-order series RC circuit 
For a series RC attached to a voltage source

with substitutions

The first characteristic unit corresponds to the total charge in the circuit. The second characteristic unit corresponds to the time constant for the system.

Second-order series RLC circuit 
For a series configuration of R,C,L components where Q is the charge in the system

with the substitutions

The first variable corresponds to the maximum charge stored in the circuit. The resonance frequency is given by the reciprocal of the characteristic time. The last expression is the linewidth of the system. The Ω can be considered as a normalized forcing function frequency.

Quantum mechanics

Quantum harmonic oscillator 
The Schrödinger equation for the one-dimensional time independent quantum harmonic oscillator is

Therefore,  has units of inverse length. To nondimensionalize this, it must be rewritten as a function of a dimensionless variable. To do this, we substitute

where  is some characteristic length of this system.  This gives us a dimensionless wave function  defined via

The differential equation then becomes

To make the term in front of  dimensionless, set

The fully nondimensionalized equation is

where we have defined

Usually, the energy term is not made dimensionless as we are interested in determining the energies of the quantum states. Rearranging the first equation, the familiar equation for the harmonic oscillator becomes

Statistical analogs 

In statistics, the analogous process is usually dividing a difference (a distance) by a scale factor (a measure of statistical dispersion), which yields a dimensionless number, which is called normalization. Most often, this is dividing errors or residuals by the standard deviation or sample standard deviation, respectively, yielding standard scores and studentized residuals.

See also 

 Buckingham π theorem
 Dimensionless number
 Natural units
 System equivalence
 RLC circuit
 RL circuit
 RC circuit
 Logistic equation

External links
Analysis of differential equation models in biology: a case study for clover meristem populations (Application of nondimensionalization to a problem in biology).
Course notes for Mathematical Modelling and Industrial Mathematics Jonathan Evans, Department of Mathematical Sciences, University of Bath. (see Chapter 3).
Scaling of Differential Equations Hans Petter Langtangen, Geir K. Pedersen, Center for Biomedical Computing, Simula Research Laboratory and Department of Informatics, University of Oslo.

Dimensional analysis